Khalifa Al-Shahyary (Arabic:خليفة الشهياري) (born 29 December 1989) is an Emirati footballer. He currently plays for Masafi as a left back .

Career
He formerly played for Masafi, and Al Urooba.

Dibba Al-Fujairah
On Season 2016, signed with Dibba Al-Fujairah . On 16 September 2016, Al-Shahyary made his professional debut for Dibba Al-Fujairah against Ittihad Kalba in the Pro League . landed with Dibba Al-Fujairah from the UAE Pro League to the UAE First Division League in 2018-19 season, he left the team after landing and came back and signed with Dibba Al-Fujairah on 11 June 2020.

References

External links
 

1989 births
Living people
Emirati footballers
Masafi Club players
Al Urooba Club players
Dibba FC players
UAE Pro League players
UAE First Division League players
Association football fullbacks
Place of birth missing (living people)